Mohamed Zouari (Sfax, 1967 - 15 December 2016) was a Tunisian aerospace engineer working for The Izz ad-Din al-Qassam Brigades, Hamas' military wing. He was assassinated in his hometown of Sfax on December 15, 2016  when he was shot dead in a drive-by shooting that has been widely attributed to the Mossad.

Biography 
Born and raised in Sfax, Mohamed Zouari was one of the followers of the Islamic political party Ennahdha. He left Tunisia in 1991 to Syria to escape the wave of political repression by the Zine El Abidine Ben Ali regime.

Having gained knowledge of aeronautics and of the design of drones, he joined the ranks of the Izz al-Din al-Qassam Brigades, the Hamas armed wing, where he supervised its unmanned aircraft manufacturing program, Ababeel1. The unmanned aircraft developed in this program were first used on the battlefield during the Gaza war of 2014. Zouari returned to Tunisia after the Tunisian Revolution.

Assassination 

On December 15, 2016, after getting in his car and just about to drive away, a truck drove up and blocked the way. Two shooters opened fire with silenced firearms, firing about twenty shots. Zouari was mortally wounded, as three bullet hits to the chest turned out to be fatal. After the assassination, the surveillance system of a restaurant near the place of the assassination had its video recordings erased by an unknown external party.

Hamas confirmed Mohamed Zouari's membership of the Izz al-Din al-Qassam Brigades and the role he played in the development of the Ababil drone in a statement released on its website on December 17, 2016. It also accused Israel of being behind the assassination and promised to avenge Zouari.

The Tunisian Government announced that it will prosecute, both nationally and abroad, any person involved in Zouari's assassination.

Asked about the assassination, Israeli Defense Minister Avigdor Liberman said that Israel would continue to defend its interests.

See also 
 Nidal Fat'hi Rabah Farahat
 Operation Wooden Leg
 Khalil al-Wazir
 Salah Khalaf

References  

1967 births
2016 deaths
Deaths by firearm in Tunisia
People from Sfax
Tunisian inventors
Assassinated Tunisian people
Hamas military members
Assassinated Hamas members
People killed in Mossad operations
Israel–Tunisia military relations